Patrick C. Pasculli (born July 20, 1939) is an American politician who served in the New Jersey General Assembly from the 31st Legislative District from 1978 to 1980.

References

1939 births
Living people
Democratic Party members of the New Jersey General Assembly
Politicians from Hoboken, New Jersey